Atlético Astorga Fútbol Club is a Spanish football team based in Astorga in the autonomous community of Castile and León. Founded in 1969, it plays in the Tercera División RFEF – Group 8. Its stadium is Estadio La Eragudina with a capacity of 3,000 seats.

History
In August 2017, Atlético Astorga announced links with Aspire Academy whose network of clubs include Cultural y Deportiva Leonesa and Leeds United. The link up saw some Aspire based players join the club.

Club's background
Club Deportivo Astorga - (1944–1968)
Atlético Astorga Fútbol Club - (1969–)

Season to season

2 seasons in Segunda División B
29 seasons in Tercera División
1 season in Tercera División RFEF

Current squad

Coaching staff

References

External links
Official website 
Futbolme team profile 
Club & stadium history 

Astorga, Spain
Football clubs in Castile and León
Association football clubs established in 1969
1969 establishments in Spain